Vincenzo Esposito (born 5 February 1963) is an Italian football coach and former player. He is the manager of  club Livorno.

Playing career
A midfielder, Esposito made his Serie A debut in 1982 with Torino. He successively joined Prato. He successively played for Lazio in the Serie B, and then for Atalanta and Cesena at Serie A level. He retired in 1996 after a second stint at Prato, with whom he totalled almost 200 first team appearances in total.

Coaching career
After retiring, Esposito stayed on at Prato as part of the club's coaching staff, then becoming the head coach in 1997, and again between 1998 and 2004. He successively went on to work as a head coach for a number of teams in the minor leagues of Italian professionalism, as well as a three-year period as Inter Milan's Under-19 coach. 

In 2011, Esposito returned to Prato as their new head coach until 2015, and then again from 2019 to 2021.

On 22 November 2022, he was hired by Serie D club Livorno as their new head coach, under the ownership of former Prato chairman Paolo Toccafondi.

References

External links
inter.it

1963 births
Living people
Footballers from Turin
Italian footballers
Italian football managers
Serie A players
Association football midfielders
Torino F.C. players
A.C. Prato players
S.S. Lazio players
Atalanta B.C. players
A.C. Cesena players
Inter Milan non-playing staff
U.S. Livorno 1915 managers